Teijirō, Teijiro or Teijirou (written: ,  or ) is a masculine Japanese given name. Notable people with the name include:

, Japanese samurai and educator
, Japanese swimmer
, Japanese admiral and politician

Japanese masculine given names